Terry Lee Cox (born March 30, 1949, in Odessa, Texas) is a former professional baseball player who played one season for the California Angels of Major League Baseball.

References

Major League Baseball pitchers
California Angels players
Baseball players from Texas
Hawaii Islanders players
Salt Lake City Angels players
1949 births
Living people
People from Odessa, Texas
Carlsbad High School (Carlsbad, New Mexico) alumni